The Federation of Independent Unions (Churitsuroren) was a national trade union federation in Japan.

The federation was established in 1962 as a loose association.  It was closely linked to the General Council of Trade Unions of Japan (Sōhyō), initially sharing most of its staff, but avoided any political affiliation.  Over time, it became more conservative and built up its own staff, but continued to co-operate closely with Sōhyō.

The federation claimed 1,200,000 members by 1967, and 1,321,000 in 1978, almost all in the private sector.  That year, it formed a loose association with the National Federation Of Industrial Organisations (Shinsambetsu), intending to merge in the future.  In 1987, it merged with both Shinsambetsu and the larger Japanese Confederation of Labour, to form the Japanese Trade Union Confederation.

Affiliates
The following unions were affiliated:

References

National trade union centers of Japan
Trade unions established in 1962
Trade unions disestablished in 1987